Jason Hsu (born 27 July 1985) is a Taiwanese singer, actor and ice hockey player. He was a member of the Taiwanese boyband 5566.

Life and career 
Hsu's father is a businessman. He has an elder sister.

Hsu is a keen ice hockey player, and has played for the Chinese Taipei national team since 2017.

Discography

Filmography

Awards and nominations

References

External links

1985 births
Living people
5566 members
21st-century Taiwanese  male singers
21st-century Taiwanese male actors
Taiwanese male television actors
Taiwanese sportsmen
Taiwanese idols